Tramways Act is a stock short titles used in India, New Zealand and the United Kingdom for legislation relating to tramways.

List

India
The Indian Tramways Act, 1886
The Indian Tramways Act, 1902

Bengal
The Bengal Tramways Act, 1883
The Calcutta Tramways Act, 1880
The Calcutta Tramways Act, 1894
The Calcutta Tramways Act, 1951

New Zealand
The Tramways Act 1872 (36 Vict No 22)

United Kingdom
The Tramways Act 1870 (33 & 34 Vict c 78)
The Military Tramways Act 1887 (50 & 51 Vict c 65)
The Tramways Orders Confirmation (No. 3) Act 1881 (44 & 45 Vict. c. clxiv)
The Tramways Orders Confirmation (No. 1) Act 1885 (48 & 49 Vict. c. lxvi)
The Tramways Orders Confirmation (No. 2) Act 1887 (50 & 51 Vict. c. cxxiii)
The Tramways Orders Confirmation (No. 1) Act 1890 (53 & 54 Vict. c. clxxxi)
The Worcester Tramways Act 1901 (1 Edw.7 c. cxci)

The Tramways (Ireland) Acts 1860 to 1895 is the collective title of the following Acts:
The Tramways (Ireland) Act 1860 (23 & 24 Vict c 152)
The Tramways (Ireland) Amendment Act 1861 (24 & 25 vict c 102)
The Tramways (Ireland) Amendment Act 1871 (34 & 35 Vict c 114)
The Tramways (Ireland) Amendment (Dublin) Act 1876 (39 & 40 Vict c 65)
The Tramways (Ireland) Amendment Act 1881 (44 & 45 Vict c 17)
The Tramways and Public Companies (Ireland) Act 1883 (46 & 47 Vict c 43)
The Light Railways (Ireland) Act 1889 (52 & 53 Vict c 66)
The Railways (Ireland) Act 1890 (53 & 54 Vict c 52)
The Transfer of Railways (Ireland) Act 1890 (54 & 55 Vict c 2)
The Tramways (Ireland) Amendment Act 1891 (54 & 55 Vict c 42)
The Tramways (Ireland) Act 1895 (58 & 59 Vict c 20)

See also
List of short titles

References

Lists of legislation by short title and collective title